MeShaunda "Shaun" Pizarrur Ellis (born June 24, 1977), nicknamed Big Katt, is a former American football defensive end who spent the majority of his career with the New York Jets of the National Football League (NFL). He played college football for the University of Tennessee.  Ellis was drafted by the New York Jets in the first round (12th overall) of the 2000 NFL Draft, and also played for the New England Patriots.  He was a two-time Pro Bowl selection. During a road-rage incident he knocked out a younger gentleman and made his shoe fall off.

College career
Ellis enrolled in the University of Tennessee, where he was a stand-out defensive end for the Tennessee Volunteers football team under head coach Phillip Fulmer. In the 1998 season, he was part of the undefeated Volunteers team that won the National Championship over Florida State in the Fiesta Bowl in Tempe, Arizona. At the end of his collegiate career, he had 105 tackles, 12.5 sacks, three forced fumbles, a fumble recovery, and one interception which he returned for 90 yards to score a touchdown.

Professional career

New York Jets (2000-2010)
Ellis was selected by the New York Jets in the first round with the 12th overall pick in the 2000 NFL Draft. He was the first of four first round draft picks that the Jets had that year, and was the compensation pick from the New England Patriots for hiring Bill Belichick away from the Jets as their head coach. The other players drafted were defensive end John Abraham (13th overall), quarterback Chad Pennington (18th overall), and tight end Anthony Becht (27th overall).

Ellis was an immediate impact player. In his rookie season, he recorded 8.5 sacks. Only defensive end Hugh Douglas, with 10 sacks in the 1995 season, ranks higher in Jets history for most sacks by a rookie. After 2001 and 2002 campaigns which saw his overall numbers drop, Ellis rebounded in the 2003 season with an impressive 12.5 sacks. Ellis followed up his 2003 season with 11 sacks in 2004. Ellis anchored a strong Jets run defense which contributed to a 10-6 season and a wild card berth. In Week 17, he recorded three sacks in the final game of the 2004 regular season against the St. Louis Rams.

On December 14, 2008, in a home game against their AFC East divisional rival Buffalo Bills, Ellis recovered a fumble from quarterback J. P. Losman and ran it for a touchdown in the final two minutes, giving the Jets the lead and the eventual 31-27 win.

On December 23, 2008, Ellis was fined $10,000 for tossing snow at opposing fans when the Jets played the Seattle Seahawks at Qwest Field the previous Sunday. Ellis claimed that it was "all in good fun."

In 2009, Ellis became the longest tenured player on the Jets roster. Under new head coach Rex Ryan, Ellis helped lead the Jets to the postseason where the Jets made the AFC Championship for the first time in 11 years but lost to the Indianapolis Colts by a score of 30–17.

Ellis helped lead the Jets to the AFC Championship for the second consecutive season in 2010 as they lost to the Pittsburgh Steelers by a score of 24-19. On January 26, 2010, Ellis was named to the 2010 Pro Bowl as a replacement for Indianapolis Colts defensive end Robert Mathis.

New England Patriots (2011)
Ellis signed with the New England Patriots on August 7, 2011, ending his 11-year tenure with the New York Jets. During the 2011 season, Ellis played in 14 games with 14 total tackles and one sack. The Patriots would finish the regular season with a 13-3 record and advanced to Super Bowl XLVI, which was Ellis's first career trip to the Super Bowl. The Patriots lost to the Giants by a score of 21–17. Ellis was released by the Patriots after the 2011 season ended.

Free agency and retirement
Ellis spent most of the 2012 season on free agency and eventually announced his retirement from professional football.

NFL career statistics

References

External links
 New York Jets profile

1977 births
Living people
African-American players of American football
American Conference Pro Bowl players
American football defensive ends
New England Patriots players
New York Jets players
People from Anderson, South Carolina
Players of American football from South Carolina
Tennessee Volunteers football players
21st-century African-American sportspeople
20th-century African-American sportspeople
Ed Block Courage Award recipients